Samuel Thomas Barnes (December 18, 1899 – February 19, 1981) was a Major League Baseball (MLB) player. Barnes played for the Detroit Tigers in the 1921 season.

Barnes was born in Suggsville, Alabama and died in Montgomery, Alabama. He played collegiate baseball at Auburn University, where he was named team captain.

He was the cousin of former Major Leaguer, Red Barnes.

External links

Baseball players from Alabama
Detroit Tigers players
1899 births
1981 deaths
People from Clarke County, Alabama
Auburn Tigers baseball players